Manuel Gregorio Fernandes (born 11 September 1944) also known as Manu Fernandes is an Indian politician and businessperson from Goa. He is a former member of the Goa Legislative Assembly, representing the Cuncolim Assembly constituency from 1984 to 1994 and Velim Assembly constituency from 1994 to 1999.

Early and personal life
Fernandes was born in Betul, Goa. He completed his (Portuguese: Segundo Año do Liceu or 10th grade). He is married to Alcina Fernandes and resides at Margao, Goa.

Positions held
 Former Chairman of Goa Industrial Development Corporation (G.I.D.C)
 Executive Committee Member of Goa Pradesh Congress Committee (G.P.C.C.)
 Committee Member on Petitions 1990-91
 Estimates Committee Member 1991-92, 1992–93, 1993–94 
 Petitions Committee Chairman 1992-93
 Library Committee Member 1991-92
 Public Accounts Committee Member 1991-92, 1992–93, 1993–94
 Government Assurances Committee Member 1992-93, 1993–94
 Committee Member on Public Undertakings 1992-93
 Committee Chairman on Petitions 1993-94
 Estimates Committee Chairman 1995-96 
 Presently, Chairman of Khadi and Village Industries Board

Notes

References

Living people
1944 births
Goa MLAs 1984–1989
Goa MLAs 1989–1994
Goa MLAs 1994–1999
People from Margao
People from South Goa district